Lee Eun-beom is a South Korean football forward who plays for Chungnam  Asan FC.

References

External links 
 

1996 births
Living people
Association football forwards
South Korean footballers
Jeju United FC players
Seongnam FC players
K League 1 players